Charles Nelson Poncy (March 2, 1922 – January 29, 2015) was an American politician in the state of Iowa.

Poncy was born in Wapello County, Iowa. He graduated Ottumwa High School and was a maintenance engineer and low rent housing commissioner. He served in the Iowa House of Representatives from 1967 to 1993 as a Democrat.

References

1922 births
2015 deaths
People from Wapello County, Iowa
Democratic Party members of the Iowa House of Representatives